Jodi Louise Grewcock (born 30 November 2004) is an English cricketer who currently plays for Northamptonshire and Sunrisers. She plays as a left-handed batter.

Domestic career
Grewcock made her county debut in 2018, for Northamptonshire against Durham in the Women's Twenty20 Cup. She played six matches for the side in 2019, across the County Championship and Twenty20 Cup. After playing four matches in the 2021 Women's Twenty20 Cup, her breakthrough season came in the 2022 Women's Twenty20 Cup, as she was the side's leading run-scorer, with 217 runs from 8 innings. She made her maiden Twenty20 half-century against Leicestershire, scoring 65 in her side's 65 run victory.

Grewcock was included in the Sunrisers Academy squad for 2021. She was again named in the Sunrisers Academy for the 2022 season, but was promoted to the first team squad in May 2022. She made her debut for the side on 11 September 2022, against Lightning in the Rachael Heyhoe Flint Trophy, scoring 35. She played one more match for the side in 2022, scoring 5 runs and taking 2/27 against Central Sparks. In February 2023, it was announced that Grewcock had signed her first professional contract with Sunrisers.

References

External links

2004 births
Living people
Place of birth missing (living people)
Northamptonshire women cricketers
Sunrisers women's cricketers